Colby Donaldson (born April 1, 1974) is an American television personality. He became the runner-up of Survivor: The Australian Outback (2001). He then competed on two more Survivor seasons, Survivor: All-Stars (2004) and Survivor: Heroes vs. Villains (2010). He has also hosted reality competition shows, such as Top Shot, Top Guns, The Butcher and Alone, all on the History network.

Early life and education
Donaldson grew up in Christoval, Texas. He played high school football for and graduated in 1992 from Christoval High School. He earned a college degree in business marketing from Texas Tech University in 1996. Then he briefly worked as an HMO's sales representative and then became a self-employed car tuner in San Angelo. He moved his business to Dallas in late 2000.

Donaldson's father, an architect in San Angelo, and mother divorced a few years before Survivor.

Survivor: The Australian Outback
Donaldson first appeared on Survivor: The Australian Outback (2001) as part of the Ogakor tribe, which was divided between two alliances: one led by bartender/actress Jerri Manthey, whose flirtations Donaldson grew weary of; and another including Keith Famie and Tina Wesson. His Texan flag was notoriously used as a rooftop for the tribe's camp.

After two Ogakor members were voted off, in the season's fourth Tribal Council (and Ogakor's third), Manthey's alliance voted agaist Famie, but Donaldson voted alongside Wesson's alliance against a member of Manthey's alliance and singer-songwriter Mitchell Olson, leading to the 3–3 tie and then the 2–2 retie. Votes cast in prior Councils weighed in to break the deadlock. Famie was not voted before, but Olson was voted once, leading to Olson's elimination.

When the Ogakor and Kucha tribes merged into the Barramundi tribe, ten overall contestants remained—five each of their own tribe. Furthermore, the former Ogakor tribe was still divided between the two alliances. One of ex-Ogakor members Keith Famie won the season's first Individual Immunity challenge, making ex-Kucha members unable to vote against Famie. In Barramundi's first Tribal Council, the ex-Ogakors, despite division among them, voted against an ex-Kucha member Jeff Varner, but ex-Kucha members, still unable to vote against Famie, voted against an ex-Ogakor member Colby Donaldson, leading to the 5–5 tie and then the 4–4 retie. To break the second tie, Varner was eliminated based on votes cast against him in prior Councils, while votes against Donaldson had never been cast previously.

The ex-Ogakors held majority advantage and voted out another ex-Kucha member. Then heavily disliked Manthey was voted off. Then eliminations of other remaining ex-Kucha members and another ex-Ogakor member Amber Brkich, who still aligned with Manthey post-merge, followed. When three players remained, Donaldson won the season's final immunity challenge, "Fallen Comrades", the quiz about eliminated contestants. This was his fifth consecutive individual immunity win.

As the only player eligible to vote while possessing the Individual Immunity necklace, Donaldson voted off Famie, whom Donaldson found unworthy to be one of the final two, placing Famie third, and kept Wesson as promised.

In the Final Tribal Council, Donaldson and Wesson revealed onscreen to the jury their own core alliance that helped maintain the Ogakor tribe's strength. They both further revealed using and holding Famie as part of their voting strategy from Olson's elimination to the final three. Donaldson became the runner-up to winner Tina Wesson by the 3–4 jury vote. For the runner-up placement, Donaldson earned $100,000.

Donaldson later sold on eBay a Pontiac Aztek that he won in one of the season's reward challenges.

Post-Australian Outback appearances
After The Australian Outback, Donaldson appeared alongside other Survivor players in the May 8, 2001, episode of The Rosie O'Donnell Show and received from Rosie O'Donnell a Harley-Davidson motorcycle, one of his answers he made in The Australian Outback Final Tribal Council. He was one of Australian Outback players appearing on Hollywood Squares on the week of May 14, 2001. He was a representative and spokesman for a Make-A-Wish Foundation fundraising event at its West Texas branch (Permian Basin) on May 16, 2002. He appeared in a Saltgrass Steak House commercial.

Donaldson moved from Dallas to Los Angeles in summer 2001 and then began taking acting lessons. He debuted his acting career in a television film Another Pretty Face, which first aired on PAX on November 8, 2002. In the film, his character has marital issues and is the son-in-law of its main character (Mel Harris), a middle-aged newscaster who is fired from a news station for being too old and then, after makeover and plastic surgery, poses as a younger woman for her new job in another news station.

Donaldson narrated an IMAX film Texas: The Big Picture, which premiered in the IMAX Theatre of the Bullock Texas State History Museum on May 3, 2003. He also appeared in televised Schick commercials by no later than early 2004.

Survivor: All-Stars
Donaldson competed in Survivor: All-Stars (2004) as part of the original Mogo Mogo tribe. Mogo Mogo and Chapera absorbed the remaining members of the Saboga tribe, which dissolved after finishing last in a rowing challenge. Then Donaldson secretly arranged to oust the Borneo winner and another Mogo Mogo tribe member Richard Hatch, whom Donaldson perceived as a threat, making Hatch the fifth player eliminated. After asserting leadership for Mogo Mogo, Donaldson was eliminated by the 3–2 vote due to his potential threat status, despite his efforts to oust The Australian Outback returnee Jerri Manthey. At the reunion show, Donaldson was most voted the sexiest Survivor male player.

Post-All-Stars appearances
Donaldson portrayed himself in "The Survivor" (2004), an episode of American sitcom Curb Your Enthusiasm. In the episode, he is mistaken for a Holocaust survivor, and he and an actual Holocaust survivor argue at a dinner table over whose survival experience was tougher to endure than the other. He portrayed also a high school sweetheart of one of leading characters in the Good Girls Don't episode that aired on Oxygen on July 9, 2004, He portrayed a cop, unbeknownst to a main character Bridget (Kaley Cuoco) who entered a club with a fake ID card and became attracted to him there, in the 8 Simple Rules episode that aired on ABC on November 12, 2004. That same year, he portrayed a love interest of Brittany Hodges (Lauren Woodland) in The Young and the Restless and a dim actor and rival of Joey Tribbiani (Matt LeBlanc) in three episodes of Joey.

Donaldson was among People magazine's "50 Hottest Bachelors" of 2004. He was one of celebrity judges for Animal Planet's Nuts for Mutts, a contest for mixed-breed dogs, that same year.

Donaldson and Survivor host Jeff Probst made guest appearances on Mad TV in 2005. He and singer Gloria Gaynor hosted an episode of fourteen-part Animal Planet series The A-List (2007) covering survival of strong animals. Donaldson frequently appeared in talk show Rachael Ray. He hosted Speed's American Thunder in 2009 and appeared at a Make-A-Wish Foundation motorcycle-based fundraiser "Rumble to the Summit" on June 12–13, 2009.

Survivor: Heroes vs. Villains
Donaldson competed for the third time in Survivor: Heroes vs. Villains (2010) as part of the Heroes tribe, which early in the season lost its four members as result of losing four of five tribal immunity challenges. After one Hero and one Villain were eliminated in the same episode, when both tribes merged, ten players remained—five each from Heroes tribe and Villains tribe. Then the remaining Heroes were systematically eliminated. When he was eliminated, Donaldson was the last remaining Hero and finished in fifth place.

Post-Heroes vs. Villains appearances
Donaldson hosted reality competition series Top Shot (2010–13),
The Butcher (2019), and
Mountain Men: Ultimate Marksman (2022–), all on  the History network.
He was one of three celebrity judges for the fifth annual Pennzoil Victory Burnout Challenge, part of the 2012 NASCAR Sprint All-Star Race.

Personal life
In 2016, Donaldson married long-time girlfriend Britt Bailey. Donaldson and his wife reside in Austin, Texas.

Donaldson inspired Survivor: Caramoan contestant Sherri Biethman to name her son after him. It is estimated that over 2,000 babies were given the name Colby in 2001 because of Donaldson's popularity.

Filmography
Main source: The Dallas Morning News (2004)

Television

Movies

Notes

References

Further reading

External links
Colby Donaldson biography for Survivor: Heroes vs. Villains at CBS.com

1974 births
Living people
American game show hosts
American male film actors
Male actors from Texas
People from San Angelo, Texas
Survivor (American TV series) contestants
Texas Tech University alumni